Wetaskiwin was a territorial electoral district in the Northwest Territories from 1898 - 1905,

At the time of its creation it included the city of Wetaskiwin, Alberta and surrounding rural region.  After the province of Alberta split from the Northwest Territories in 1905, Wetaskiwin would continue to exist as a district until 1971.

No election ever took place as both elections were decided by Acclamations.

Election Results 1898 - 1902

See also
 Wetaskiwin Federal electoral district
 Wetaskiwin Alberta provincial electoral district

Former electoral districts of Northwest Territories